John Steptoe (September 14, 1950 – August 28, 1989) was an author and illustrator for children’s books dealing with aspects of the African-American experience. He is best known for Mufaro’s Beautiful Daughters, which was acknowledged by literary critics as a breakthrough in African history and culture.

Early life
John Steptoe was born in Brooklyn, New York. He began drawing as a young child and received formal art training at the High School of Art and Design in Manhattan, and had Norman Lewis as his instructor. He also attended the Vermont Academy, where he studied under the sculptor John Torres, and William Majors, a widely acclaimed painter.

Career
Steptoe began his first picture book, Stevie, when he was only 16 years old. In 1967, while still a high school student and without an appointment, Steptoe took his portfolio to the office of Harper & Row. His artwork made a good impression on a staff member in the Department of Books for Boys and Girls, and days later Steptoe returned to see department director Ursula Nordstrom. After the meeting Nordstrom wrote to tell him, "We think you are tremendously talented and we are delighted to think that your first book will be for us." In the same letter she offered Steptoe a contract and an advance as soon as he had a "rough" dummy of the book ready.

Stevie was published in 1969 to outstanding critical praise. It received national attention when it appeared in its entirety in Life magazine, which commended it for being "a new kind of book for black children."

Since his publication of Stevie, John Steptoe illustrated 15 more picture books, 10 of which he also wrote. The American Library Association named The Jumping Mouse in 1985 and Mufaro’s Beautiful Daughters in 1988 Caldecott Honor Books, a prestigious award for children’s book illustrations. Steptoe also received the Coretta Scott King Award for illustration for both Mother Crocodile (written by Rosa Guy) in 1982 and Mufaro’s Beautiful Daughters. While all of Steptoe’s works deals with the African-American experience, Mufaro’s Beautiful Daughters was widely praised by reviewers and critics as a breakthrough of African history and culture. Based on an African tale from the 19th century, it required Steptoe to research his heritage giving him the chance to awaken his pride in his African ancestry. John Steptoe hoped that his books would lead African-American children to feel pride in their origins as well.

Caldecott Honors for Illustration
 1985 Story of Jumping Mouse-A Native American Legend
 1988 Mufaro’s Beautiful Daughters

Coretta Scott King Award for Illustration
 1982 Mother Crocodile
 1988 Mufaro’s Beautiful Daughters

Family
Steptoe had two children: Bweela, who is one of the models for many of Steptoe's books including Mufaro's Beautiful Daughters, and son Javaka Steptoe, who is also a children's book author and illustrator. He won the 2017 Caldecott Medal for his book Radiant Child: The Story of Young Artist Jean-Michel Basquiat.

Death and legacy

John Steptoe died on August 28, 1989, at Saint Lukes Hospital in Manhattan of AIDS. He was 38 years old. At the time of his death, Steptoe was among the few African-American artists who made a career in children’s literature. Following his death, the American Library Association established the John Steptoe Award for New Talent, which is given to affirm new talent and excellence in writing and/or illustration.

References

.

.

.

.

External links
 
 The John Lewis Steptoe Cultural Center
  (under 'Steptoe, John, 1950–' without '1989', previous page of browse report)

1950 births
1989 deaths
20th-century American writers
AIDS-related deaths in New York (state)
African-American graphic designers
African-American illustrators
American children's book illustrators
Writers from New York City
High School of Art and Design alumni
20th-century American male writers
Writers from New York (state)
20th-century African-American writers
African-American male writers
Vermont Academy alumni